Air Marshal Sir Nigel Holroyd Mills,  (12 November 1932 – 18 October 1991) was a British military doctor.

Career
Mills was the son of Air Chief Marshal Sir George Mills. He was educated at Berkhamsted School and Middlesex Hospital Medical School. He was Director General Medical Services (Royal Air Force) from 1987 to 1990 and Surgeon General from 1990 to 1991.

References

External links
 RCP London, Lives of the Fellows: Sir Nigel Holroyd Mills

 

People educated at Berkhamsted School
Royal Air Force air marshals
Knights Commander of the Order of the British Empire
Fellows of the Royal College of Physicians
Fellows of the Royal College of General Practitioners
1932 births
1991 deaths
Surgeons-General of the British Armed Forces
20th-century British medical doctors
Royal Air Force Medical Service officers
Military personnel from Kent